Dr. Susanna Rahkamo (born 25 February 1965) is a Finnish former competitive  figure skater, sports leader and leadership consultant.

Education and Research 
Susanna Rahkamo holds a PhD (Aalto University, Industrial Engineering) and a Master's degree in Food Science and Economics (University of Helsinki). Rahkamo’s doctoral dissertation in the research field  of management, organizations and work psychology examines the impact of creative thinking in the process of acquiring exceptional expertise. According to her study, six critical factors are needed in the process: questioning and playing with thought; insight;  systemic application; faith in self; inner drive; and persistent work.  Dr.Rahkamo offered this conclusion: Little sparks of insights appear little by little through collaboration, seeing, probing and reflecting, affecting an exclusive perspective, understanding, view and allowing holistic insights to develop. Therefore, building excellence is a collective activity merging many peoples' knowing together.

Competitive Skating and Ice Show Appearances and Productions 
Rahkamo competed with Petri Kokko in ice dancing winning the European Championship and World Championship silver in 1995, the World Championship bronze in 1994 and the European Championship bronze in 1993. The couple competed twice in the Olympics, in 1992 in Albertville (6th place) and in 1994 in Lillehammer (4th place). They were nine times national champions between 1987-1995.
After 1995, Rahkamo and Kokko became professionals. They skated in various shows and competitions for five years until they ended their careers in Finland with the Tango Cafe tour at the end of 2000. During their professional years, the pair participated in numerous professional competitions in the United States. In the 1995-1996 season, the couple toured with the highly successful  Stars on Ice show in the United States.

The couple also produced ice skating tours, shows and TV productions in Finland, Germany and the United States. Their TV series  Susanna and Petri on Ice on MTV3 ran for  two seasons MTV3. In 1996, the couple performed in a music video for the band Enigma. Rahkamo and Kokko left their mark on the ice dance in so many ways. The International Skating Union (ISU) commissioned them to develop a new compulsory dance from a quickstep rhythm dance they had used from 1994-99 in competitions. This Finnstep was included in the ISU program for the period 2008-2009. It was ratified in June 2008 as the Finnstep at the Sochi Olympics in 2014. In the period 2020–2021, the Finnstep was also the mandatory part of short dance.

Leadership in Sport 
Dr. Rahkamo was President of the Finnish Figure Skating Association from 2004 to 2014 for a total of five terms. During her presidency, Finnish figure skating was internationally successful. Three different women skaters won nine Championship medals,  five of them gold.  Synchronized skating also blossomed during Dr. Rahkamo’s presidency with a grand total of thirteen medals at the World championships in Synchronized Skating. During her term, Finland organized three financially and athletically successful Championships in which Laura Lepistö won the European Championship gold and Susanna Pöykiö bronze. At the Synchronized World Figure Skating Championships in Helsinki in 2011, Finnish teams the Rockettes brought gold and Marigold Ice Unity silver. At the end of the season, Dr. Rahkamo was successful in applying for the 2017 World Championships in Finland.

Since November 2008, she has served on the Board of the Finnish Olympic Committee and since 2012 as its Vice President. In 2014, Rahkamo was elected Chairman of the Olympic Culture and Legacy Commission of the EOC (European Olympic Committee). During her  term, the Commission's mission has been to promote the Olympic values. To further this mission, the Commission created the European Young Olympic Ambassadors program for young future sport leaders to engage with the European Youth Olympic Festival participants to learn about Olympic values. The fourth training program began in the summer of 2020.

In 2016, Dr. Rahkamo was selected by the International Skating Union (ISU) to lead their strategic flagship project, the Development Commission. The Commission supports local and regional development projects for all three ISU disciplines (Short Track, Speed Skating, Figure Skating) in ISU member countries.  Two major accomplishments are the creation  of the global ISU Centers of Excellence network and the ISU e-learning. In 2020 Rahkamo was appointed to the steering group of the ISU Digital Development and AI Group.

Leadership in Business 
Since 2005, Dr. Rahkamo has worked as a leadership consultant and since 2010 as a senior partner at Pertec Consulting specializing in management consulting.  In the autumn of 2019, she sold Pertec Consulting Oy to Hälsa Oy.  In 2021, she joined with two other partners to form Yellow Method Oy, which gathers data and insights about the creative potential of organizations.

Family 
Rahkamo and Kokko married in 1995 and have two children. Rahkamo is the daughter of politician Lord Mayor of Helsinki, Kari Rahkamo.

Programs

Results

Sources

External links

Finnish Figure Skating Association (STLL)
Maxilla Oy – Rahkamo's consulting work

Navigation

Living people
1965 births
Finnish female ice dancers
Olympic figure skaters of Finland
Figure skaters at the 1992 Winter Olympics
Figure skaters at the 1994 Winter Olympics
Figure skating officials
Sportspeople from Helsinki
World Figure Skating Championships medalists
European Figure Skating Championships medalists
Dancers from Helsinki